John Jones Milligan (December 10, 1795 – April 20, 1875) was an American lawyer and politician from Wilmington, in New Castle County, Delaware. He was a member of the Whig Party, who served as United States Representative from Delaware.

Political career
Milligan served eight years representing Delaware in the U.S. House of Representatives. Elected as an Anti-Jacksonian in 1830, he became a member of the Whig Party when it was organized and served from March 4, 1831 until March 3, 1839. Having been defeated for reelection to a fifth term, he was appointed Associate Judge of the Delaware Superior Court on September 19, 1839 and served until September 16, 1864, when he retired.

Death and legacy
Milligan died at his retirement home in Philadelphia and is buried in the Wilmington and Brandywine Cemetery at Wilmington.

Milligan is described in the Diaries of Edmund Canby as follows: "...(he)...is a beautiful speaker, his manner is fine, gestures good, matter well arranged, distinct and clear- certainly one of the most delightful speakers I have ever heard...Milligan would be a splendid speaker with practice...he has many happy hits and some beautiful classical illusions...He is, I am told, a fine classical scholar."

Almanac
Elections were held the first Tuesday of October and, beginning 1832, the first Tuesday after November 1. U.S. Representatives took office March 4 and have a two-year term.

Notes

References

External links
Biographical Directory of the United States Congress 
Delaware's Members of Congress
Find a Grave
The Political Graveyard
Superior Court Judges, past & present

Places with more information
Delaware Historical Society; website; 505 North Market Street, Wilmington, Delaware 19801; (302) 655-7161
University of Delaware; Library website; 181 South College Avenue, Newark, Delaware 19717; (302) 831-2965
Newark Free Library; 750 Library Ave., Newark, Delaware; (302) 731-7550

1795 births
1875 deaths
Princeton University alumni
People from Wilmington, Delaware
Burials at Wilmington and Brandywine Cemetery
Delaware Whigs
Members of the United States House of Representatives from Delaware
Associate Judges of Delaware
National Republican Party members of the United States House of Representatives
Delaware National Republicans
Whig Party members of the United States House of Representatives
19th-century American politicians
People from Cecil County, Maryland
19th-century American judges